Itinerario is a peer-reviewed academic journal of history published three times a year by Cambridge University Press on behalf of the Leiden Institute for History (Leiden University). It covers research on the expansion of Europe in the context of colonialism between about 1500 and 1950. The journal publishes original research articles, archival notes, interviews, and reviews. Itinerario is also affiliated to the Forum for European Expansion and Global Interaction.

External links 
 

History journals
Triannual journals
Cambridge University Press academic journals
Publications established in 1976
English-language journals
Academic journals associated with universities and colleges
Leiden University